A pineal gland cyst is a usually benign (non-malignant) cyst in the pineal gland, a small endocrine gland in the brain. A 2007 study by Pu et al. found a frequency of 23% in brain scans (with a mean diameter of 4.3 mm).

Despite the pineal gland being in the center of the brain, due to recent advancements in endoscopic medicine, endoscopic brain surgery to drain and/or remove the cyst can be done with the patient spending 5-10 nights in the hospital, and being fully recovered in weeks, rather than a year, as is the case with open-skull brain surgery.

The National Organization for Rare Disorders states that pineal cysts larger than 5.0 mm are "rare findings" and are possibly symptomatic.  If narrowing of the cerebral aqueduct occurs, many neurological symptoms may exist, including headaches, vertigo, nausea, muscle fasciculations, eye sensitivity, and ataxia. Continued monitoring of the cyst might be recommended to monitor its growth, and surgery may be necessary.

Additional images

References

Further reading

External links
 Pineal Cyst Images and Radiological Findings
 radiopaedia.org article - Pineal Cyst

Central nervous system disorders
Neuroendocrinology
Cysts